Choe Won-taek (1895 – 17 March 1973) was a leading North Korean politician who served as Chairman of the Supreme People's Assembly from 1957 to 1967. Furthermore, he was a member of the 2nd, 3rd, 4th and 5th term of the Central Committee.

Life
Choi was born in Daegu in 1895.From June 1923, he worked as an organizer of yacheika (ячейка, communist cells) in Daegu which was part of the Korburo(Корбюро,꼬르뷰로, a Korean branch of Comintern). He also worked in the socialist ideological group called Sangmihoe (尙微會).

References

Citations

Bibliography
Books:
 

Members of the 1st Supreme People's Assembly
Members of the 2nd Supreme People's Assembly
Members of the 3rd Supreme People's Assembly
Members of the 4th Supreme People's Assembly
Members of the 5th Supreme People's Assembly
Members of the 2nd Central Committee of the Workers' Party of Korea
Members of the 3rd Central Committee of the Workers' Party of Korea
Members of the 4th Central Committee of the Workers' Party of Korea
Members of the 5th Central Committee of the Workers' Party of Korea
Korean communists
1895 births
1973 deaths
North Korean politicians
People from North Hamgyong